The McLean Professor of Ancient and Modern History is a senior professorship at Harvard University. It was endowed by the will of wealthy merchant John McLean.

The first McLean Professor was Jared Sparks who held the chair between 1838 and 1849; he was later President of Harvard College. The current holder is Emma Dench, who was appointed in 2015.

List of McLean Professors

 Jared Sparks (1838 to 1849); first McLean Professor
 Henry Warren Torrey (1856 to 1886)
 Ephraim Whitman Gurney (1886)
 Silas Marcus MacVane (1886 to 1911)
 Edward Channing (1912 to 1929)
 William Scott Ferguson (1929 to 1945)
 Crane Brinton (1946 to 1968) 
 Franklin L. Ford (1968 to 1990)
 Steven Ozment (1990 to 2015)
 Emma Dench (2015 to present)

References

Ancient and Modern History, McLean
Ancient and Modern History, McLean, Harvard
Ancient and Modern History, McLean, Harvard